Williams v. Walker-Thomas Furniture Co., 350 F.2d 445 (D.C. Cir. 1965), was a court opinion, written by Judge J. Skelly Wright, that had a definitive discussion of unconscionability as a defense to enforcement of contracts in American contract law.  As a staple of first-year law school contract law courses, it has been briefed extensively.

It flows from interpretation of the Uniform Commercial Code § 2-302 (1954) and is relevant for the Restatement (Second) of Contracts § 208.

Facts
The case involved Walker-Thomas Furniture Company (Washington, D.C. at 7th St. & L St. NW) extending credit to Williams for a series of furniture purchases made between 1957 and 1962. Williams had been paying monthly installments for several years, before finally defaulting on a payment after purchasing a stereo. The contract that Williams had signed with Walker-Thomas stipulated that the purchaser cannot own any item until their entire balance has been paid off. When Williams defaulted on the contract in 1962, Walker-Thomas then tried to repossess all the furniture that Williams had purchased since 1957. The District of Columbia Court of Appeals ruled that the lower court could rule the contract unconscionable and refuse to enforce it, and returned the case to the lower court to decide whether or not the contract was in fact unconscionable.

Judgment
J. Skelly Wright held that the case needed to be sent back to trial to determine further facts, but in doing so, he held that a contract may be set aside if it was procured by unconscionable means.

Significance
This case is often used by legal professors in the United States to question their students' ideology or presumptions.    It is also used as a case study in some modern economics classes.

See also
Lloyds Bank Ltd v Bundy
Tunkl v. Regents of the University of California, 60 Cal 2d 92, 383 P2d 441 (1963) (Mr. Tunkl's wife sued for damages after her husband was admitted to a charitable hospital after signing a waiver for any negligence, and whose life was lost in an operation. Tobriner J held that the exemption was invalid on the ground that Mr. Tunkl has far inferior bargaining power.)

Notes

External links
 Abridged text of case at SCU law school web site

United States contract case law
United States Court of Appeals for the District of Columbia Circuit cases